Alan Jeffrey Quaife (3 May 1945 – 27 August 2019) was an Australian rules footballer who played for the Fitzroy Football Club in the Victorian Football League (VFL).

Notes

External links 

1945 births
2019 deaths
Australian rules footballers from Victoria (Australia)
Fitzroy Football Club players